In political science and political history, the term power vacuum, also known as a power void, is an analogy between a physical vacuum to the political condition "when someone in a place of power, has lost control of something and no one has replaced them." The situation can occur when a government has no identifiable central power or authority. The physical analogy suggests that in a power vacuum, other forces will tend to "rush in" to fill the vacuum as soon as it is created, perhaps in the form of an armed militia or insurgents, military coup, warlord or dictator. The term is also often used in organized crime when a crime family becomes vulnerable to competition.

Hereditary or statutory order of succession or effective succession planning are orderly ways to resolve questions of succession to positions of power. When such methods are unavailable, such as in failed dictatorships or civil wars, a power vacuum arises, which prompts a power struggle entailing political competition, violence, or (usually) both. A power vacuum can also occur after a constitutional crisis in which large portions of the government resign or are removed, creating unclear succession.

Historical examples 

Historic examples include the defeat of France in the Franco-Prussian War, the death of Vladimir Lenin, and the decrease in power of Great Britain and France in the Middle East after the Suez Crisis.

During the course of the Ming treasure voyages (1405–1433), the Chinese Ming empire was the dominant political and military force within the Indian Ocean. However, in 1433, the Chinese government withdrew their treasure fleet and thus left a large void within the Indian Ocean.

Contemporary examples 

In 2003, when the United States led a coalition to oust Saddam Hussein in the Iraq War, the absence of an all-out Iraqi opposition force at war with government forces meant that once the Ba'ath Party was removed, no local figures were on hand to immediately assume the now-vacant administerial posts. For this reason, Paul Bremer was appointed by the United States government as the interim head of state to oversee the transition.

In other western-led interventions such as in Kosovo (1999) and Libya (2011) where the initial claim of justification in each case was a humanitarian matter, there had been active opposition fighting on the ground to oust the relevant governments (in the case of Kosovo, this meant removal of state forces from the desired territory rather than ousting the government itself). Subsequently, successor entities were immediately effective in Libya and Kosovo.

Power vacuums often occur in failed states sometimes referred to as Fragile states where the state has lost the power to prevent its citizens from forming states within states, such as in post-communist Moldova's Transnistria.

See also
 Anarchy
 Failed state
 State collapse
 Provisional government

References 

Politics by issue
Political science terminology
Changes in political power
Power (social and political) concepts